Oleksandr Stetsenko (born 2 March 1990) is a Ukrainian football defender who plays for amateur Ukrainian club Shturm Ivankiv.

Career
Stetsenko is a product of FC Vidradnyi Kyiv Youth Sportive School system.

He spent his career as a player in the Ukrainian First League and the Ukrainian Second League. In August 2017 he signed a contract with Tajikistani football club Istiklol.

Career statistics

Club

Honours

Club
 Istiklol
 Tajik League (1): 2017

References

External links

 

1990 births
Living people
Footballers from Kyiv
Ukrainian footballers
Association football defenders
Ukrainian expatriate footballers
Expatriate footballers in Israel
Expatriate footballers in Tajikistan
FC Dynamo-2 Kyiv players
FC Dynamo-3 Kyiv players
FC Arsenal Kyiv players
FC Metalist Kharkiv players
FC Sevastopol players
FC Desna Chernihiv players
MFC Mykolaiv players
FC Poltava players
FC Kramatorsk players
PFC Sumy players
FC Istiklol players
Ukrainian expatriate sportspeople in Israel
Ukrainian expatriate sportspeople in Tajikistan
Tajikistan Higher League players